The 1979 Dutch Grand Prix was a Formula One motor race held on 26 August 1979 at Zandvoort.

Summary
René Arnoux put his Renault on pole position but the slow start of the turbocharged car allowed Alan Jones to break free. Arnoux and Clay Regazzoni collided, eliminating the Williams on the spot while the poleman only lasted to the end of the lap as he limped back to the pits. Jody Scheckter fell to last place on the first lap and began the task of working through the field. Gilles Villeneuve, who made it through the first lap ahead of Jean-Pierre Jabouille, passed Jones at Tarzan on lap 11. He gave the lead back to Jones when he spun on lap 47. On lap 51, just after passing the pits, Villeneuve's left rear tyre exploded causing him to spin. He regained control to begin one of the wildest laps in history. He drove an entire lap on two tyres, the right front was in the air and the left rear was shredding rubber and sparking with the pavement. Reaction was mixed. It was either an act of the ultimate competitor not wanting to give up or an irresponsible, emotional decision. Either way he was out as his suspension was too damaged to rejoin the race. Jones finished first giving him his third consecutive and Williams their fourth consecutive victory. However, Scheckter worked his way up to finish second and due to Jones' poor performance in the first half of the season thanks to the Williams only getting quicker halfway through the season, Ferrari driver only needed 4 more points to ensure a Ferrari would win the driver's title.

Classification

Qualifying

Race

Championship standings after the race 

Drivers' Championship standings

Constructors' Championship standings

Note: Only the top five positions are included for both sets of standings. Only the best 4 results from the first 7 races and the best 4 results from the last 8 races counted towards the Drivers' Championship. Numbers without parentheses are Championship points; numbers in parentheses are total points scored.

References

Dutch Grand Prix
Dutch Grand Prix
Grand Prix
Dutch Grand Prix